Ban Khai Thai Halt is a railway halt located in Khuan Maphrao Subdistrict, Phatthalung City, Phatthalung.

Train services 
 Local No. 445/446 Chumphon-Hat Yai Junction-Chumphon
 Local No. 447/448 Surat Thani-Sungai Kolok-Surat Thani
 Local No. 463/464 Phatthalung-Sungai Kolok-Phatthalung

References 
 
 

Railway stations in Thailand